Euacidalia brownsvillea is a moth of the family Geometridae. It is found in  North America, including Texas as well as Hawaii.

External links
Images
Bug Guide

Sterrhini
Moths described in 1931